Blood and Guts is a live album by American jazz pianist Mal Waldron featuring a performance recorded in Paris in 1970 and released on the French Futura label.

Track listing
All compositions by Mal Waldron except as indicated
 "Down at Gill's" — 11:42 
 "My Funny Valentine" (Lorenz Hart, Richard Rodgers) — 10:48 
 "La Petite Africaine" — 14:08 
 "Blood and Guts" — 10:55 
Recorded at the Centre Culturel Americain in Paris, France, on May 12, 1970.

Personnel
 Mal Waldron — piano 
 Patrice Caratini — bass
 Guy Hayat — drums

References

Futura Records live albums
Mal Waldron albums
1970 live albums